George Franklin Drew (August 6, 1827 – September 26, 1900) was the 12th Governor of the U.S. state of Florida.

Early life and career 
George Franklin Drew was born on  August 6, 1827 in Alton, New Hampshire. Drew had a grammar school level education and quit going to school when he was 12 because of his family's financial problems and ended up working on the family farm. Drew moved to Lowell, Massachusetts in 1841 to become an apprentice. He moved to the South in 1847 where he opened a machine shop in Columbus, Georgia. During the American Civil War, Drew was loyal to the Union despite living in the Confederacy. After the Civil War ended, he moved to Ellaville, Florida in 1865 where he opened the largest sawmill in Florida.

Drew was a supporter of Ulysses S. Grant's presidential run in 1868. During Reconstruction in Florida, he became the chairman of the Madison County's commissioners in 1870. Drew would unsuccessfully run for the Florida State Senate in 1872.

Governorship 
In 1876 he would be elected as the Governor of Florida and during his campaign he drew support from African Americans, and Whig/Unionist Party elements in the state. Drew became the Governor of Florida on January 2, 1877. 

As governor he would try to eliminate the state's budget deficit from the state's previous administration. In his 1877 program he sent to the state legislature, he would follow the economic trajectory of Bourbon Democrats. To eliminate the deficit he proposed cutting expenditures and did not have much hope for immediate tax credits. He would end up closing the state prison at Chattahoochee to save money and ended up establish convict leasing instead.

With regards to education, Drew said it would be “cheaper to build schoolhouses and maintain schools than to build poorhouses and jails and support paupers and criminals.” He believed that the state had a responsibility to support the education of African Americans. Minor improvements were done to public school system at the elementary level with rural education being encouraged and textbooks being standardized; Drew's support did not extent to public high schools which he advocated eliminating. During Drew's administration he decided to abandon the Florida Agriculture College which was set to open in Eau Gallie.

Drew opted to not seek a second term in 1880.

Later life and death 
He left office on January 4, 1881, returning to the lumber business. Later in life, he would settle in Jacksonville serving as the president of the city's trade board. Drew died on September 26, 1900, in Jacksonville.

References

External links
Official Governor's portrait and biography from the State of Florida
Last Letter of Governor George Franklin Drew From the State Library & Archives of Florida.

Democratic Party governors of Florida
1827 births
1900 deaths
People from Alton, New Hampshire
19th-century American politicians